Please Remain Calm is the third studio album by Wallingford, Connecticut based rock band Hostage Calm. On August 28, 2012, the band released the single, "Brokenheartland." Released in October 2012, Please Remain Calm garnered wide critical acclaim and praise. Following this, the band supported Rival Schools on their headlining US tour. In September and October 2013, the band supported Saves the Day on their headlining US tour.

Track listing

Personnel

Hostage Calm
 Tom Chiari - Lead Guitar
 Tim Casey - Bass, Vocals
 Chris Martin - Lead Vocals, Guitars, Piano
 Nick Balzano - Guitar, Backing Vocals
 John Ross - Drums

Additional Personnel
 Ev Wivell - Artwork, Design
 Dan Coutant - Mastering
 Jamie Moore - Photography
 Chris Brooks - Piano, Keyboards, Organ
 Hostage Calm - Producer, Music, Lyrics (tracks: 1 to 3, 5 to 10)
 J. Robbins - Producer, Recording, Mixing
 Gordon Withers - Cello (track 6)
 Ron Rolling - Trumpet (track 6)
 Katie Lynch - Violin (track 6)
 Greg Moran - Vocals, Lyrics (track 4)
 Justin Fogleman - Additional Production (track 8)

References

2012 albums
Hostage Calm albums
Run for Cover Records albums